The Sumgayit FK 2018-19 season was Sumgayit's eight Azerbaijan Premier League season, and ninth season in their history. It is their first season with Nazim Suleymanov as manager.

Squad

Transfers

In

Loans in

Out

Released

Trial

Friendlies

Competitions

Premier League

Results summary

Results

League table

Azerbaijan Cup

Final

Squad statistics

Appearances and goals

|-
|colspan="14"|Players who left Sumgayit during the season:

|}

Goal scorers

Disciplinary record

References

Azerbaijani football clubs 2018–19 season
Sumgayit FK seasons